Gobbato is a surname. Notable people with the surname include:

Giuseppe Gobbato (born 1904), Italian racewalker
Ugo Gobbato (1888–1945), Italian engineer and business executive
Pier Ugo Gobbato (1918–2008), Italian racing driver, engineer and general manager of Ferrari and Lancia, son of Ugo Gobbato.

Italian-language surnames